Toutes griffes dehors is a 1982 French miniseries.

Cast

 Sophie Desmarets as Fanny
 Serge Avedikian as Gilbert Dautun
 Jany Holt as Mlle Monelle
 Jacques François as Alain
 Pierre Tornade as Barbazan
 Claudia Demarmels as Bénédicte
 Christian Marin as Bob Loiseau
 Blanchette Brunoy as Francine
 Gérard Hernandez as Simonès
 Maria Sebaldt as Monique
 François Perrot as M. Merlin
 Marco Perrin as Uncle Fernand
 Patricia Elig as Josyane
 Marc Bassler as Jean-Claude
 Marie-Noëlle Eusèbe as Toura
 Sylvie Granotier as Lorraine
 Charlotte Maury-Sentier as Zouzou
 Luc Florian as Mourad
 Walter Buschhoff as M. Azam
 Roland Oberlin as Didier
 Carolin Ohrner as Gwendoline
 Fred Personne as M. Cuvier
 Jacques Sereys as Lionel Desforges
 Catherine Jacob
 Hélène Duc
 Jeanne Herviale
 Isabelle Mergault
 Jean-Roger Milo
 Robert Rollis

References

External links
 

1980s French television miniseries
1982 French television series debuts
1982 French television series endings